Tikar is a village in Bhilwara district in the state of Rajasthan, India.

References

Villages in Bhilwara district